{{Infobox settlement
| name                     = Tangerang
| settlement_type          = City
| official_name            = City of Tangerang{{nobold|Kota Tangerang}}
| other_name               = 
| translit_lang1           = Other
| translit_lang1_type1     = Sundanese
| translit_lang1_info1     = 
| translit_lang1_type2     = 
| translit_lang1_info2     = 
| image_skyline            = 

| image_caption            = From top, left to right: Alam Sutera CBD, Boen Tek Bio temple in Pasar Lama, Tangerang City Mall, Al-Azhom Grand Mosque, and Soekarno–Hatta International Airport
| image_shield             = Seal of the City of Tangerang.svg
| image_flag               = Flag of Tangerang City.png
| shield_size              = 100px
| nickname                 = Kota Penerbangan (City of Aviation) and Exoville| motto                    = Bhakti Karya Adhi Kerta Rahardja  (Carry on the work by devotion towards prosperity)
| image_map                = Locator Kota Tangerang.png
| map_caption              = Location within Banten
| pushpin_map              = Indonesia_Java#Indonesia
| pushpin_label_position   = right
| pushpin_map_caption      = Location in Java and Indonesia
| coordinates              = 
| subdivision_type         = Country
| subdivision_name         = Indonesia
| subdivision_type1        = Province
| subdivision_name1        = Banten
| established_title        = Formation
| established_date         = 28 February 1993
| government_type          = City government
| leader_title             = Mayor
| leader_name              = Arief Rachadiono Wismansyah
| leader_party             = Demokrat
| leader_title1            = Vice Mayor
| leader_name1             = Sachrudin
| area_total_km2           = 164.55
| area_land_km2            = 
| area_water_km2           = 
| area_water_percent       = 
| elevation_m              = 
| population_total         = 1930556
| population_as_of         = mid 2022 estimate
| population_density_km2   = auto
| population_note          = 
| postal_code_type         = Postcodes
| postal_code              = 15xxx and 19xxx
| area_code                = (+62) 21
| area_code_type           = Area code
| registration_plate       = B
| website                  = 
| footnotes                = 
| timezone                 = Indonesia Western Time
| utc_offset               = +7
| timezone_DST             = 
| utc_offset_DST           = 
}}

Tangerang (Sundanese:) is a city in the province of Banten, Indonesia. Located on the western border of Jakarta, it is the third largest urban centre in the Greater Jakarta metropolitan area after Jakarta and Bekasi; the sixth largest city proper in the nation; and the largest city in Banten province. It has not only functioned as a dormitory city, as there are many industrial areas such as Jatake, and several business districts, including CBD Alam Sutera in the area. Located just next to Jakarta on the west with many road access and improved infrastructure, such as new toll road, it is one of the favorite location for property seekers and investors in the Bodetabek area.

Tangerang, along with the neighbouring South Tangerang, is where many large-scale developers have created built-up areas such as BSD City, Gading Serpong, Alam Sutera, and Lippo Village, and now becoming the area's center of economy, business, commerce, and education.

Tangerang is also home for Soekarno–Hatta International Airport which serves the Jakarta metropolitan area and is Indonesia's main gateway. The city is an industrial and manufacturing hub on Java and is home to over 1,000 factories. Many international corporations have plants in the city. Tangerang tends to be hot and humid, with little in the way of trees or geographical features. Certain areas consist of swamps, including the areas near the Soekarno–Hatta International Airport. It's also home to Indonesia Convention Exhibition (ICE) BSD City, Indonesia's largest convention and exhibition center located in BSD City.

In recent years the urban expansion of Jakarta has covered Tangerang. As the result, many of its residents commute to Jakarta for work or vice versa. Many high-class and middle-class satellite cities have been developed in Tangerang, complete with their own shopping malls, private schools and convenience centers. The government is working on expanding the toll road system to accommodate more traffic flow to and from the area.

Tangerang is the corporations' alternative to move or build their offices from Jakarta due to the heavy traffic and crowds, such as Unilever Indonesia, Kino Group, and Alfa Group.

History
 Origins 
According to F. de Haan's writings taken from the VOC archives, reports that the Banten Sultanate had created a large country located west of the Untung Jawa River, and to fill the new land the Sultan of Banten had displaced 5,000 to 6,000 inhabitants.

In the Dag Register dated December 20, 1668, it was reported that the Sultan of Banten had appointed Raden Sena Pati and Kyai Demang as rulers. On suspicion of seizing the kingdom, Raden Sena Pati and Kyai Demang were sacked by the Sultan.

Prince Dipati was appointed to the region. For the dismissal, Ki Demang pitted Banten against the VOC. But he was killed in Kademangan.

The next VOC archive, the Dag Register dated March 4, 1680, explains that the ruler of Tangerang at that time was Kyai Dipati Soera Dielaga. Kyai Soeradilaga and his son Subraja asked for the protection of the VOC, followed by 143 retinues and soldiers. He and his retinue were given a place on the east side of the river, bordering the VOC. When fighting with Banten, Soeradilaga and his war experts succeeded in repelling Bantenesu troops. For his services, he was given the honorary title of Raden Aria Suryamanggala, while Prince Subraja was given the title of Kyai Dipati Soetadilaga.

Subsequently, Raden Aria Soetadilaga was appointed Regent of Tangerang I with an area covering the Angke River and Cisadane River. The title he used was Aria Soetidilaga I. Then with an agreement signed on April 17, 1684, Tangerang became territory of the VOC. Banten did not have the right to intervene in regulating governance in Tangerang. One of the articles of the agreement reads: And it must be known with certainty the extent to which the boundaries of the territory that have been understood since the past will still be determined, namely the area bounded by Tangerang from the Java Sea coast to the mountains to the South Sea. That all land along Tangerang will belong to or be occupied by the VOC.

With the agreement, the regent's territory expanded to the west of the Tangerang river. To monitor Tangerang, it was deemed necessary to add more guard posts along the Tangerang river border, because the Bantenese often attacked suddenly. According to a map made in 1692, the oldest post is located at the mouth of the Cisadane River, to the north of Kampung Baru. However, when a new post was established, the location shifted to the south at the mouth of the Tangerang River. According to the archives of Gewone Resolutie Van hat Casteel Batavia, on April 3, 1705, there were plans to demolish the buildings in the post because they only had bamboo walls. Then the building was proposed to be replaced with a wall. Governor-General Zwaardeczon strongly agreed with the proposal, and was even instructed to build a wallei fence around the buildings in the guard posts, so that the Bantenese could not attack. The new fort that would be built was planned to have a wall 20 feet thick or more. There will be placed 30 Europeans under the leadership of a Vandrig and 28 Makassarese who will live outside the fort. The basic material for the fort is bricks obtained from Tangerang Regent Aria Soetadilaga I.

After the fort was completed its was manned by 60 Europeans and 30 Blacks as well as Makassarese recruited as VOC soldiers. This fort later became the base of the VOC in the face of the rebellion from Banten.Then in 1801, it was decided to repair and strengthen the post or garrison, with a new building located 60 meters to the southeast, precisely located east of Jalan Besar PAL 17. Indigenous people at that time were more familiar with this building as "Fortress". .Since then, Tangerang is known as the Citadel. This fort since 1812 has not been maintained anymore, even according to the "Superintendent of Public Building and Work" dated March 6, 1816 stated:"... The fort and barracks in Tangerang are now neglected, no one wants to see them anymore. Many doors and windows were broken and people even took it for their own sake."Indonesian revolution
In October 1945, a Muslim militia, was established in Tangerang. The goal of this movement was to establish an Islamic nation in Indonesia. This movement later became a part of DI/TII rebel group. On 31 October 1945,  kidnapped Otto Iskandardinata, the Republic of Indonesia's Minister of State. He was presumed to have been murdered at Mauk beach, Tangerang on 20 December 1945.

Recent history
Tangerang city was formed as an autonomous city on 27 February 1993 out of the Tangerang Regency. The city was previously an administrative city within that regency.

In 2007, the city government passed an anti-prostitution law which meant that women who are perceived to be dressed too provocatively may be arrested. Some news outlets reported that some women decided to wear the hijab to avoid being prosecuted under this law. In addition the city government began requiring municipal employees to abide by Islamic dress codes.

In 2021, a fire at Tangerang prison killed at least 41 inmates and injured 80 people.

Situ Gintung flood

Tangerang District is the location of the Situ Gintung reservoir built by the Dutch colonial authorities in 1933. It was surrounded by a dam up to 16 metres (52 ft) high, which failed on 27 March 2009 with the resulting floods killing at least 93 people.

 Geography 

Tangerang City is located in the northwest region of Banten Province and is on the north side of Java Island. Astronomically, the city is located 106°33'–106°44' east longitude and 6°05'–6°15 south latitude. Tangerang City has an area of 164.55 km2.[5]

The city is bordered by Tangerang Regency to the west and north, South Tangerang to the south, and Jakarta to the east.
Cisadane River that crosses Tangerang City.

Tangerang City is crossed by one of the largest rivers in the west of Java, namely the Cisadane River. This river is an inseparable part of the identity of the City of Tangerang. The headwaters of this river are located on the slopes of Mount Salak and Mount Pangrango, Bogor.

Topography 
Topographically, Tangerang City is mostly located at an altitude of 10–30 meters above sea level, aka the whole area is in the lowlands. The northern part of the city (covering most of Benda District) has an average height of 10 meters above sea level, while the southern part of Tangerang City has a height of 30 meters above sea level.

Furthermore, Tangerang City has a soil slope of 0-3% and a small part (i.e. in the southern part of the city) with a slope of between 3%-8% is in Parung Serab, Paninggilan and Cipadu Jaya.

Climate
Tangerang has a tropical rainforest climate (Af) with moderate rainfall from May to October and heavy rainfall from November to April.

Administrative districts
The city of Tangerang is divided into thirteen districts (kecamatan), tabulated below with their areas and populations at the 2010 Census and the 2020 Census, together with the official estimates as at mid 2022. The table also includes the number of administrative villages (urban kelurahan) in each district, and its postal codes.

South Tangerang

South Tangerang (Tangerang Selatan) is a city which, like Tangerang city, is administratively separate from Tangerang Regency. It is subdivided into seven districts – Serpong, Serpong Utara (North Serpong), Ciputat, Ciputat Timur (East Ciputat), Pondok Aren, Pamulang, and Setu. Located on the southwest of Jakarta, it has an area of 164.85 square kilometres and a population of 1,354,350 at the 2020 Census. The official estimate as at mid 2022 was 1,378,466.

 Economy 

Tangerang is the center of manufacturing and industry on the island of Java and has more than 1000 factories. Many international companies have factories in this city. Tangerang has a climate that tends to be hot and humid, with little forest or other geographic areas. Certain areas consist of swamps, including the area around Soekarno-Hatta International Airport.

In recent years, Jakarta's urban expansion has encompassed Tangerang, and as a result many residents commute to Jakarta for work, or vice versa. Many middle-class and upper-class satellite cities are being developed in Tangerang, complete with shopping centers, private schools and mini markets. The government is working on developing a toll road system to accommodate the increasing traffic flow to and from Tangerang. Tangerang was once part of the West Java Province which since 2000 separated itself and became part of the Banten Province.

Tangerang's economy depends highly on service sectors, trading, financial service, and manufacturing. Jatake, which is Tangerang's biggest industrial area, is home to over 1,000 industrial corporations.

As the impact of Jakarta's growing economy continues, Tangerang has become an alternative location for some corporations in which to build their offices due to crowds and land prices. CBD in Alam Sutera is the notable central business district, comprising several corporations, business centers, apartments, and educational facilities. Some headquarters of big corporations are located here, such as Kino Group, Alfamart, Deltomed, Top Food, and more. It also has several business center nearby, such as Lippo Karawaci and Gading Serpong, both are located in Tangerang Regency.

Garuda Indonesia, and Sriwijaya Air have their head offices at Soekarno–Hatta International Airport.

There are plans by CFLD Indonesia to develop part of Tangerang, namely Tangerang New City, into the most advanced new industrial township which will encompass 4 pillars industry park – Electronics & ICT, Construction Materials, Automotive and Machinery & Equipment Industrial Parks.

Shopping
Tangerang is the home for shopping in Banten area. Numerous shopping centres and markets are available here. The largest shopping mall in Tangerang and Banten is Supermall Karawaci in Lippo Village. Another shopping malls available are :
 Mall @ Alam Sutera
 TangCity Mall
 Metropolis Town Square
 IKEA Alam Sutera
 CBD Ciledug
 Plaza Baru Ciledug
 Mall Ciledug
 Tomang Tol Plaza
 Traditional market Pasar Lembang where there are has bus terminal also
 Traditional market Pasar Lama where there are many street foods

Demographics

Tangerang has a significant community of Chinese Indonesians, many of whom are of Cina Benteng extraction. They are part of the country's Peranakan Chinese community, but with deep, centuries-old roots in the historic Tangerang area, also called 'Benteng' locally.

Most of the old settlements in Tangerang have colonial, Chinese districts, such as at Sewan, Pasar Lama, Pasar Baru, Benteng Makasar, Kapling and Karawaci Lama (the precursor to Lippo Karawaci). One can find any food and all things Chinese there. In addition, a large proportion of Benteng Chinese have traditionally been rural dwellers, engaged in agricultural activities, such as farming and livestock production.

Due to the growth of satellite towns in the greater Jakarta region, which includes Tangerang, the area is now home to many new migrants from all parts of Indonesia. Some notable planned town and housing complex in the city are Alam Sutera (the CBD area, while most of its area located in Serpong, South Tangerang city, Lippo Village (North), Banjar Wijaya, and Modernland (Kota Modern).

Transportation

Tangerang is connected to Trans-Java Toll Road, and the following are the roads and highway in the city :

Main Road : 
 Jl. Jenderal Sudirman
 Jl. MH Thamrin
 Jl. Daan Mogot
 Jl. Gatot Subroto
 Jl. Hos Cokroaminoto
 Jl. Ciledug Raya

Highway : 
 Jakarta-Tangerang Toll Road
 Tangerang-Merak Toll Road
 Cengkareng-Batuceper-Kunciran Toll Road
 Prof. Sedyatmo Toll Road (airport toll road)

Soekarno-Hatta International Airport is the main hub for air transport in Jakarta Metropolitan Area as well as Tangerang.
Air-conditioned public bus shuttle is available from the airport to destinations in Jakarta. This is operated by DAMRI, a state-owned company.

Jakarta–Merak Toll Road and Cengkareng-Batuceper-Kunciran Toll Road provide highway connections from Jakarta and surrounding cities.

Soekarno-Hatta Airport Rail Link stops at Batuceper Station, providing direct access to Soekarno-Hatta International Airport via Soekarno-Hatta Airport Station and Soekarno-Hatta Airport Skytrain people mover.

The Transjakarta Corridor 13 that serve CBD Ciledug - Tendean - CBD Ciledug.

The Transjakarta Corridor T11 that serve Bundaran Senayan - Poris Plawad - Bundaran Senayan

The feeder buses of Transjakarta serves commuters from Bumi Serpong Damai and Bintaro Jaya. There are also private shuttle bus services from Jakarta to private residential area such as Lippo Karawaci and Citra Raya.

The "Tayo" Trans Kota Tangerang Corridor 3 CBD Ciledug - TangCity - CBD Ciledug

Several taxi companies operating in the city, such as the express taxi, blue bird, and the local operator Arimbi.

There are 17 intersections prone to traffic congestion with the obsolete Multi Program Eight Phase System. By 2012, Tangerang will have a new technology, called the Intelligent Transport System (ITS), that uses a closed-circuit camera that responds to traffic conditions at any given intersection and could reduce the rate of congestion by 30 percent.

Attractions
Al-A'zhom Mosque
Al-Azhom Grand Mosque is a congregational mosque at the alun-alun Tangerang. Opened in 2003, it is the largest mosque in Banten province. With the maximum capacity of 15,000 worshippers, it is one of the largest mosques in the world.

Benteng Heritage Museum

Benteng Heritage Museum is a historic townhouse that was restored and repurposed as a museum by a Benteng Chinese businessman Udaya Halim. It was opened on a specifically chosen auspicious date: November 11, 2011 or 11/11/11. The museum displays Benteng Chinese artefacts and other cultural objects related to the history of Tangerang's Chinese community.

Boen Tek Bio
Boen Tek Bio is the oldest Chinese temple, or klenteng'', in Tangerang – with a history going back to 1684.

Kali Pasir Mosque
Kali Pasir Mosque is the oldest mosque in Tangerang city, established in 1700, and a relic of Pajajaran Kingdom. It is located in Cisadane riverbank, in the middle of Chinese residential and is characterized by Chinese pattern.

Education

Tangerang provides educational facilities from kindergarten to college. In addition to government schools, there are many private schools such as :
 BPK Penabur Kota Tangerang (formerly BPK Penabur Kota Modern)
 Sekolah Dian Harapan, Lippo Village
 Sekolah Harapan Bangsa, Modernland
 Sekolah Yadika 3 (SD, SMP, SMA), Karang Tengah
 Sekolah Yadika 4 (SMK), Karang Tengah

It houses the following colleges and universities:
 Pelita Harapan University @ Lippo Village, Karawaci
 BINUS University Alam Sutera Campus
 Bunda Mulia University Alam Sutera Campus
 Muhammadiyah University Tangerang
 Swiss German University Alam Sutera Campus

Tangerang also provide daycare, preschool, and kindergarten:

References

External links

 Official website
 portal from tangsel
An encounter with history in Tangerang

 
Populated places in Banten